BAP Villavicencio  is the second out of four s ordered by the Peruvian Navy in 1973. It was built by the Italian shipbuilder Cantieri Navali Riuniti at its shipyard in Riva Trigoso, Genoa. Delays in the building of the first ship of the class, BAP Carvajal, meant Villavicencio was commissioned first on 25 June 1979 with the pennant number FM-52.

Villavicencio is named after Vice Admiral Manuel Villavicencio (1840–1925) who fought in the War of the Pacific.

Sources 

1978 ships
Carvajal-class frigates
Ships built by Fincantieri
Ships built in Italy